Michael Christ Roussos (February 8, 1926 – April 1987) was an American football offensive tackle in the National Football League for the Washington Redskins and the Detroit Lions.  He played college football at the University of Pittsburgh.

1926 births
1987 deaths
American football offensive tackles
Players of American football from Pennsylvania
Pittsburgh Panthers football players
Washington Redskins players
Detroit Lions players
People from New Castle, Pennsylvania